René Rachou was a Brazilian physician and researcher on malaria who was the director of the Institute of Malariology of the Oswaldo Cruz Institute in Rio de Janeiro. He also worked with the Pan-American Health Organization. The Institute was moved to Belo Horizonte in 1955, and, after his death, in 1965, it was renamed Centro de Pesquisas René Rachou in his honor.

References

External links
 History of the René Rachou Research Center. Instituto Oswaldo Cruz, in Portuguese.

1965 deaths
People from Taubaté
Brazilian tropical physicians
Malariologists
20th-century Brazilian physicians
20th-century Brazilian scientists